Central Kingstown (CK) is a House Of Assembly Constituency. It has been represented by St Clair Leacock since 2010

Elections

External links
http://www.caribbeanelections.com/vc/constituencies/CK.asp

Parliamentary constituencies in Saint Vincent and the Grenadines